Petr Přikryl (born February 17, 1978) is a Czech professional ice hockey goaltender. He played with HC Plzeň in the Czech Extraliga during the 2010–11 Czech Extraliga season.

References

External links 
 
 

1978 births
Living people
Czech ice hockey goaltenders
HC Plzeň players
People from Litoměřice
Sportspeople from the Ústí nad Labem Region
HC Slovan Ústečtí Lvi players
HK Dukla Trenčín players
Nürnberg Ice Tigers players
HC Stadion Litoměřice players
MsHK Žilina players
Czech expatriate ice hockey players in Germany
Czech expatriate ice hockey players in Slovakia